R. J. Johnston was the 19th Surveyor General of Ceylon. He was appointed in 1943, succeeding L. G. O. Woodhouse, and held the office until 1946. He was succeeded by I. F. Wilson.

References

J